Samahquam First Nation,  the Semahquam First Nation are a band of the In-SHUCK-ch Nation, a subgroup of the larger St'at'imc people (the In-SHUCK-ch are also referred to as Lower Stl'atl'imx).  The Douglas, Skatin and Samahquam communities are related through familial ties as well as culturally and linguistically. They are the southernmost of the four divisions making up the Lillooet ethnographic group.

British Columbia Treaty Process
Please see In-SHUCK-ch Nation#British Columbia Treaty Process.

Demographics
Number of Band Members: 303.

See also
St'át'timc Chiefs Council

References

St'at'imc governments
Lillooet Country